Polycrates of Ephesus (fl. c. 130 – 196) was an Early Christian bishop at Ephesus.  Polycrates convened a synod to establish Quartodecimanism as the official position on Easter. His letter was written between 186-195 AD.

Quartodeciman controversy 
When Pope Victor wanted to set an official practice of Easter on the whole Christian world, to celebrate Easter on Sunday, Polycrates writing in the name of the entire Asian church, argued that the apostles taught to celebrate Easter on the 14th day of Nisan. In his letter he appeals to the authority of Polycarp of Smyrna, Thraseas of Eumenia, Sagaris, Papirius and Melito, all of whom were Quartodecimans.

Despite Polycrates convening a synod in Ephesus to declare Quartodecimanism official, later the tradition died out, because Nicea declared Easter to be celebrated on a Sunday.

Notes

External links
Entry on Polycrates at Early Christian Writings
 Polycrates: Unity or Truth, "Religion and Spirituality", Spring 2005.

2nd-century bishops in Roman Anatolia
2nd-century Christian saints
2nd-century Romans
Bishops of Ephesus